Yevgeniy Voyna (born 12 January 2000) is a Belarusian professional footballer who plays for Molodechno.

References

External links 
 
 

2000 births
Living people
People from Slutsk
Sportspeople from Minsk Region
Belarusian footballers
Association football defenders
FC Energetik-BGU Minsk players
FC Lokomotiv Gomel players
FC Molodechno players